En Magan is the title of two Tamil-language films:
 En Magan (1945 film), a romantic Second World War front line film directed by R. S. Mani
 En Magan (1974 film), a remake of Be-Imaan, directed by C. V. Rajendran

See also
 Em Magan, a 2006 Indian Tamil family drama film by Thirumurugana
 En Magal, a 1954 Indian Tamil film